, also known as Tom and Jerry, is a platform video game developed and published by Sega in 1992 for the Master System. In 1993, the game was converted to the Game Gear with completely different level stages, but the same gameplay. The film Tom and Jerry: The Movie has the same name but no relevance to the game content.

Plot 
In the Master System version, Tom has an adventurous big chase for Jerry inside the house, outside, through the country then back inside the house, ending with Tom finally catching Jerry momentarily. In the Game Gear version, Tom chases Jerry on a quest to look for a hidden treasure taking them from the house all the way to an island where the treasure is buried.

Gameplay 
The player controls Tom in the game. He chases Jerry through long level stages, hindered by Jerry who lays explosive traps and goes under platforms. Tom can climb platforms, jump gaps, and pounce. Ideally, Jerry can be caught at the end of the level by solving a puzzle, but it is possible to catch Jerry earlier in the level with great difficulty. Once Jerry is caught, the level ends and proceeds to the next one.

Reception

Releases
The game was released on Sega Master System in 1992, Game Gear in 1993, Game Boy on October 2, 1993, and on Genesis more than two months later. Because of the extremely bad reviews the film received, the title was altered to Tom and Jerry: Frantic Antics!.

References

External links 
 

1992 video games
1993 video games
Master System games
Game Gear games
Platform games
Video games based on Tom and Jerry
Cartoon Network video games
Single-player video games